is a passenger railway station located in the town of Mannō, Nakatado District, Kagawa Prefecture, Japan. It is operated by JR Shikoku and has the station number "D17".

Lines

Layout
The station, which is unstaffed, consists of a side platform serving a single track tracks on an embankment high above the surrounding farmland. There is no station building, only a shelter for waiting passengers. A flight of steps leads up from the access road to the platform and the station is thus not wheelchair accessible. There is a bike shed by the side of the access road.

Adjacent stations

History
Kurokawa Station opened on 1 October 1961 under the control of Japanese National Railways (JNR). With the privatization of JNR on 1 April 1987, control of the station passed to JR Shikoku.

Surrounding area
The station is located in a rural area surrounded by rice fields.

See also
 List of Railway Stations in Japan

References

External links

JR Shikoku timetable 

Railway stations in Kagawa Prefecture
Railway stations in Japan opened in 1961
Mannō, Kagawa